Surveys of scientists' views on climate change – with a focus on human-caused or anthropogenic global warming (AGW) – have been undertaken since the 1990s. A 2016 paper (which was co-authored by Naomi Oreskes, Peter Doran, William Anderegg, Bart Verheggen, Ed Maibach, J. Stuart Carlton and John Cook, and which was based on a half a dozen independent studies by the authors) concluded that "the finding of 97% consensus [that humans are causing recent global warming] in published climate research is robust and consistent with other surveys of climate scientists and peer-reviewed studies." A 2019 study found scientific consensus to be at 100%, and a 2021 study found that consensus exceeded 99%.

2020s

Myers et al., 2021
Krista Myers led a paper which surveyed 2780 Earth scientists. Depending on expertise, between 91% (all scientists) to 100% (climate scientists with high levels of expertise, 20+ papers published) agreed human activity is causing climate change. Among the total group of climate scientists, 98.7% agreed. The agreement was lowest among scientists who chose Economic Geology as one of their fields of research (84%).

Lynas et al., 2021
In 2021, Mark Lynas et al assessed studies published between 2012 and 2020. They found over 80,000 studies. They analysed a random subset of 3000. Four of these were skeptical of the human cause of climate change, 845 were endorsing the human cause perspective at different levels, and 1869 were indifferent to the question. The authors estimated the proportion of papers not skeptical of the human cause as 99.85% (95% confidence limit 99.62%–99.96%). Excluding papers which took no position on the human cause led to an estimate of the proportion of consensus papers as 99.53% (95% confidence limit 98.80%–99.87%). They confirmed their numbers by explicitly looking for alternative hypotheses in the entire dataset, which resulted in 28 papers.

2010s

Powell, 2019 
In 2019, James L. Powell, a former member of the National Science Board, analysed titles of peer-reviewed studies published in the first seven months of 2019 and found not a single study disagreed with the consensus view. When the titles implied uncertainty about the cause of climate change, the abstracts or the article in its entirety were examined. The total amount of articles found via Web of Science was 11,602.

Verheggen et al., 2014 
In 2014, Bart Verheggen of the Netherlands Environmental Assessment Agency surveyed 1,868 climate scientists. They found that, consistent with other research, the level of agreement on anthropogenic causation correlated with expertise - 90% of those surveyed with more than 10 peer-reviewed papers related to climate (just under half of survey respondents) explicitly agreed that greenhouse gases were the main cause of global warming. They included researchers on mitigation and adaptation in their surveys in addition to physical climate scientists, leading to a slightly lower level of consensus compared to previous studies.

Powell, 2013 
James L. Powell analyzed published research on global warming and climate change between 1991 and 2012 and found that of the 13,950 articles in peer-reviewed journals, only 24  (<0.2%) rejected anthropogenic global warming. This was a follow-up to an analysis looking at 2,258 peer-reviewed articles published between November 2012 and December 2013 revealed that only one of the 9,136 authors rejected anthropogenic global warming.

John Cook et al., 2013 
Cook et al. examined 11,944 abstracts from the peer-reviewed scientific literature from 1991 to 2011 that matched the topics 'global climate change' or 'global warming'. They found that, while 66.4% of them expressed no position on anthropogenic global warming (AGW), of those that did, 97.1% endorsed the consensus position that humans are contributing to global warming. They also invited authors to rate their own papers and found that, while 35.5% rated their paper as expressing no position on AGW, 97.2% of the rest endorsed the consensus. In both cases the percentage of endorsements among papers expressing a position was marginally increasing over time. They concluded that the number of papers actually rejecting the consensus on AGW is a vanishingly small proportion of the published research.

In their discussion of the results, the authors said that the large proportion of abstracts that state no position on AGW is as expected in a consensus situation, as anticipated in a chapter published in 2007, adding that "the fundamental science of AGW is no longer controversial among the publishing science community and the remaining debate in the field has moved on to other topics."

A 2016 study entitled Learning from mistakes in climate research examined the quality of the 3% of peer-reviewed papers discovered by this work to reject the consensus view. They discovered that "replication reveals a number of methodological flaws, and a pattern of common mistakes emerges that is not visible when looking at single isolated cases".

Farnsworth and Lichter, 2011 
In an October 2011 paper published in the International Journal of Public Opinion Research, researchers from George Mason University analyzed the results of a survey of 998 scientists working in academia, government, and industry. The scientists polled were members of the American Geophysical Union (AGU) or the American Meteorological Society (AMS) and listed in the 23rd edition of American Men and Women of Science, a biographical reference work on leading American scientists, and 489 returned completed questionnaires. Of those who replied, 97% agreed that global temperatures have risen over the past century. 84% agreed that "human-induced greenhouse warming is now occurring," 5% disagreed, and 12% didn't know.

When asked what they regard as "the likely effects of global climate change in the next 50 to 100 years," on a scale of 1 to 10, from Trivial to Catastrophic:
13% of respondents replied 1 to 3 (trivial/mild), 44% replied 4 to 7 (moderate), 41% replied 8 to 10 (severe/catastrophic), and 2% didn't know.

Anderegg, Prall, Harold, and Schneider, 2010 

 Anderegg et al., in a 2010 paper in the Proceedings of the National Academy of Sciences of the United States of America (PNAS), reviewed publication and citation data for 1,372 climate researchers, based on authorship of scientific assessment reports and membership on multisignatory statements about anthropogenic climate change. The number of climate-relevant publications authored or coauthored by each researcher was used to define their 'expertise', and the number of citations for each of the researcher's four highest-cited papers was used to define their 'prominence'. Removing researchers who had authored fewer than 20 climate publications reduced the database to 908 researchers but did not materially alter the results. The authors of the paper say that their database of researchers "is not comprehensive nor designed to be representative of the entire climate science community," but say that since they drew the researchers from the most high-profile reports and public statements, it is likely that it represents the "strongest and most credentialed" researchers both 'convinced by the evidence' (CE) and 'unconvinced by the evidence' (UE) on the tenets of anthropogenic climate change.

Anderegg et al. drew the following two conclusions:

(i) 97–98% of the climate researchers most actively publishing in the field surveyed here support the tenets of ACC (Anthropogenic Climate Change) outlined by the Intergovernmental Panel on Climate Change, and (ii) the relative climate expertise and scientific prominence of the researchers unconvinced of ACC are substantially below that of the convinced researchers.

2000s

Doran and Kendall Zimmerman, 2009 
This paper is based on the Zimmerman 2008 MS thesis; the full methods are in the MS thesis. A web-based poll performed by Peter Doran and Maggie Kendall Zimmerman of the Earth and Environmental Sciences department, University of Illinois at Chicago. They received replies from 3,146 of the 10,257 polled Earth scientists. The survey was designed to take less than two minutes to complete. Results were analyzed globally and by specialization. Among all respondents, 90% agreed that temperatures had generally risen compared to pre-1800 levels, and 82% agreed that humans significantly influence the global temperature. 76 out of the 79 respondents who "listed climate science as their area of expertise, and who also have published more than 50% of their recent peer-reviewed papers on the subject of climate change", thought that mean global temperatures had risen compared to pre-1800s levels. Of those 79 scientists, 75 out of the 77 (97.4%) answered that human activity was a significant factor in changing mean global temperatures. The remaining two were not asked, because in question one they responded that temperatures had remained relatively constant. Economic geologists and meteorologists were among the biggest doubters, with only 47 percent and 64 percent respectively thinking that human activity was a significant contributing factor. In summary, Doran and Zimmerman wrote:

Bray and von Storch, 2008 
Dennis Bray and Hans von Storch, of the Institute for Coastal Research at the Helmholtz Research Centre in Germany, conducted an online survey in August 2008, of 2,059 climate scientists from 34 different countries, the third survey on this topic by these authors. A web link with a unique identifier was given to each respondent to eliminate multiple responses. A total of 375 responses were received giving an overall response rate of 18%. The climate change consensus results were published by Bray, and another paper has also been published based on the survey.

The survey was composed of 76 questions split into a number of sections. There were sections on the demographics of the respondents, their assessment of the state of climate science, how good the science is, climate change impacts, adaptation and mitigation, their opinion of the IPCC, and how well climate science was being communicated to the public. Most of the answers were on a scale from 1 to 7 from 'not at all' to 'very much'.

In the section on climate change impacts, questions 20 and 21 were relevant to scientific opinion on climate change.
Question 20, "How convinced are you that climate change, whether natural or anthropogenic, is occurring now?" Answers:  67.1% very much convinced (7), 26.7% to some large extent (5–6), 6.2% said to some small extent (2–4), none said not at all.
Question 21, "How convinced are you that most of recent or near future climate change is, or will be, a result of anthropogenic causes?" Answers:  34.6% very much convinced (7), 48.9% being convinced to a large extent (5–6), 15.1% to a small extent (2–4), and 1.35% not convinced at all (1).

STATS, 2007 
In 2007, Harris Interactive surveyed 489 randomly selected members of either the American Meteorological Society or the American Geophysical Union for the Statistical Assessment Service (STATS) at George Mason University. The survey found 97% agreed that global temperatures have increased during the past 100 years; 84% say they personally believe human-induced warming is occurring, and 74% agree that "currently available scientific evidence" substantiates its occurrence. Only 5% believe that human activity does not contribute to greenhouse warming; 41% say they thought the effects of global warming would be near catastrophic over the next 50–100 years; 44% say said effects would be moderately dangerous; 13% saw relatively little danger; 56% say global climate change is a mature science; 39% say it is an emerging science.

Oreskes, 2004 
A 2004 article by geologist and historian of science Naomi Oreskes summarized a study of the scientific literature on climate change. The essay concluded that there is a scientific consensus on the reality of anthropogenic climate change. The author analyzed 928 abstracts of papers from refereed scientific journals between 1993 and 2003, listed with the keywords "global climate change". Oreskes divided the abstracts into six categories: explicit endorsement of the consensus position, evaluation of impacts, mitigation proposals, methods, paleoclimate analysis, and rejection of the consensus position. 75% of the abstracts were placed in the first three categories, thus either explicitly or implicitly accepting the consensus view; 25% dealt with methods or paleoclimate, thus taking no position on current anthropogenic climate change; none of the abstracts disagreed with the consensus position, which the author found to be "remarkable". According to the report, "authors evaluating impacts, developing methods, or studying paleoclimatic change might believe that current climate change is natural. However, none of these papers argued that point."

Bray and von Storch, 2003 
In 2003, Bray and von Storch conducted a survey of the perspectives of climate scientists on global climate change. The survey received 530 responses from 27 different countries. The 2003 survey has been strongly criticized on the grounds that it was performed on the web with no means to verify that the respondents were climate scientists or to prevent multiple submissions. The survey required entry of a username and password, but the username and password were circulated to a climate change denial mailing list and elsewhere on the internet. Bray and von Storch defended their results and accused climate change deniers of interpreting the results with bias. Bray's submission to Science on 22 December 2004 was rejected.

One of the questions asked in the survey was "To what extent do you agree or disagree that climate change is mostly the result of anthropogenic causes?", with a value of 1 indicating strongly agree and a value of 7 indicating strongly disagree. The results showed a mean of 3.62, with 50 responses (9.4%) indicating "strongly agree" and 54 responses (9.7%) indicating "strongly disagree". The same survey indicates a 72% to 20% endorsement of the IPCC reports as accurate, and a 15% to 80% rejection of the thesis that "there is enough uncertainty about the phenomenon of global warming that there is no need for immediate policy decisions."

1990s 
 In 1996, Dennis Bray and Hans von Storch undertook a survey of climate scientists on attitudes towards global warming and related matters. The results were subsequently published in the Bulletin of the American Meteorological Society. The paper addressed the views of climate scientists, with a response rate of 40% from a mail survey questionnaire to 1000 scientists in Germany, the United States and Canada. Most of the scientists accepted that global warming was occurring and appropriate policy action should be taken, but there was wide disagreement about the likely effects on society and almost all agreed that the predictive ability of currently existing models was limited. On a scale of 1 (highest confidence) to 7 (lowest confidence) regarding belief in the ability to make "reasonable predictions" the mean was 4.8 and 5.2 for 10- and 100-year predictions, respectively. On the question of whether global warming is occurring or will occur, the mean response was 3.3, and for future prospects of warming the mean was 2.6.
 A Gallup poll of 400 members of the American Geophysical Union and the American Meteorological Society along with an analysis of reporting on global warming by the Center for Media and Public Affairs, a report on which was issued in 1992. Accounts of the results of that survey differ in their interpretation and even in the basic statistical percentages:
 Fairness and Accuracy in Reporting states that the report said that 67% of the scientists said that human-induced global warming was occurring, with 11% disagreeing and the rest undecided.
 George Will reported "53 percent do not believe warming has occurred, and another 30 percent are uncertain." (Washington Post, 3 September 1992). In a correction Gallup stated: "Most scientists involved in research in this area believe that human-induced global warming is occurring now."
 Stewart, T. R., Mumpower, J. L., and Reagan-Cirincione, P. (1992). Scientists' opinions about global climate change: Summary of the results of a survey. NAEP (National Association of Environmental Professionals) Newsletter, 17(2), 6–7.
 In 1991, the Center for Science, Technology, and Media conducted a survey of 118 scientists regarding views on the climate change. Analysis by the authors of the respondents projections of warming and agreement with statements about warming resulted in them categorizing response in 3 "clusters":  13 (15%) expressing skepticism of the 1990 IPCC estimate, 39 (44%) expressing uncertainty with the IPCC estimate, and 37 (42%) agreeing with the IPCC estimate.
 Global Environmental Change Report, 1990: GECR climate survey shows strong agreement on action, less so on warming. Global Environmental Change Report 2, No. 9, pp. 1–3

References

See also
Scientific opinion on climate change

Climatology
Surveys (human research)
Polling
Point of view